Juan Francisco Delis (February 27, 1928 – July 23, 2003) was a Cuban professional baseball player and third baseman/outfielder in Major League Baseball who appeared in 54 games for the  Washington Senators.

Delis' organized baseball career began in 1952 in the Washington organization; he also played in the Cuban Winter League, winning the "Rookie of the Year" award during the 1953–54 season. His one year in the majors saw Delis make 25 hits, including three doubles and one triple. He had three three-hit games: against Detroit on April 30, against Boston on May 21, and against New York in his next contest, on May 24. He started 21 games at third base and eight in the outfield.

After his major league career, Delis played in the high levels of minor league baseball through 1964, and retired after the 1966 season. He led the Mexican League in doubles with 43 in 1960 and 37 in 1962.

References

External links

1928 births
2003 deaths
Danville Leafs players
Havana Cubans players
Havana Sugar Kings players
Major League Baseball players from Cuba
Cuban expatriate baseball players in the United States
Major League Baseball third basemen
Savannah Redlegs players
Seattle Rainiers players
Sportspeople from Santiago de Cuba
Sultanes de Monterrey players
Venados de Yucatán (minor league) players
Washington Senators (1901–1960) players